The 2010–11 Indiana State Sycamores men's basketball team represented Indiana State University during the 2010–11 NCAA Division I men's basketball season. The Sycamores, led by first year head coach Greg Lansing, played their home games at the Hulman Center and are members of the Missouri Valley Conference. They finished the season 20–14, 12–6 in Missouri Valley play and won the 2011 Missouri Valley Conference men's basketball tournament to earn an automatic bid in the 2011 NCAA Division I men's basketball tournament where they lost in the second round to Syracuse.

Roster

Schedule
 
|-
!colspan=9| Exhibition

|-
!colspan=9| Regular season

|-
!colspan=9| Missouri Valley tournament

|-
!colspan=9| NCAA tournament

References

Indiana State
Indiana State
Indiana State Sycamores men's basketball seasons
Syca
Syca